Terellia luteola is a species of tephritid or fruit flies in the genus Neaspilota of the family Tephritidae.

Distribution
Spain, Italy, Greece, Israel, Egypt & Tunisia.

References

Tephritinae
Insects described in 1830
Diptera of Africa
Diptera of Europe
Diptera of Asia